Baskin-Robbins is an American multinational chain of ice cream and cake speciality shops owned by Inspire Brands. Based in Canton, Massachusetts, Baskin-Robbins was founded in 1945 by Burt Baskin (1913–1967) and Irv Robbins (1917–2008) in Glendale, California. It is the world's largest chain of ice cream speciality stores, with more than 8,000 locations, including nearly 2,500 shops in the United States and over 5,000 in other countries. Baskin-Robbins has stores in nearly 50 countries.

The company is known for its "31 flavors" slogan, with the idea that a customer could have a different flavor every day of any month. The slogan came from the Carson-Roberts advertising agency (which later merged into Ogilvy & Mather) in 1953. Baskin and Robbins believed that people should be able to sample flavors for free until they found one they wanted to buy.

The company has introduced more than 1,300 flavors since 1945, including the 2019 addition of vegan and non-dairy flavors. The company has been based in Canton, Massachusetts, since 2004 after moving from Randolph, Massachusetts.

History
Baskin-Robbins was founded in 1948 by American brothers-in-law Burt Baskin and Irv Robbins from the merging of their respective ice cream parlors, in Glendale, California.

Burt Baskin learned about ice cream while he was in the military during World War II. He somehow obtained some equipment and started making ice cream for other soldiers. He even got a little experimental with it when he started using some tropical fruits. After the war he wanted to continue with his ice cream business, so he opened up Burton's Ice Cream Shop in California in 1946.

Irv Robbins had been in the ice cream business his entire life. When he was a teenager in 1930s, Robbins managed an ice cream counter in his father's store. He too entered the military during World War II. As soon as he returned he used $6,000 to open Snowbird Ice Cream in California in 1945.

During Baskin's time in the military, he married Robbin's sister, Shirley Robbins. In 1948, they decided to combine their companies into one and call it Baskin-Robbins. Snowbird Ice Cream offered 21 flavors, a novel concept at that time. When the separate companies merged in 1948, the number of flavors was expanded to 31.

By 1948, Burt and Irv had opened six stores. The first franchise covering the sale of ice cream was executed May 20, 1948, for the store at 1130 South Adams in Glendale (Store #1). In 1949, the company's production facility opened in Burbank. Burt and Irv made the decision to start selling the stores to the managers. In 1953, Baskin-Robbins hired Carson-Roberts Advertising who recommended adoption of the number 31 as well as the pink (cherry) and brown (chocolate) polka dots and typeface that were reminiscent of the circus. The first store that adopted the new 31 look was 804 North Glendale Ave. in Glendale, California, in March 1953.

Between 1949 and 1962, the corporate firm was Huntington Ice Cream Company. The name succeeded The Baskin-Robbins Partnership, and was eventually changed back to Baskin-Robbins, Inc. on November 26, 1962. Baskin-Robbins was owned by its founders until it was acquired in 1967 (just prior to Burt Baskin's death) by United Fruit. In the 1970s, the chain went international, opening stores in Japan, Saudi Arabia, South Korea, and Australia.

During the 1970s, two future American celebrities got their first jobs at Baskin-Robbins. Chris Buck applied icing to ice cream cakes prior to his high school graduation in 1976. Barack Obama spent the summer of 1978 scooping ice cream.

In 1972, the company went public for the first time in its history when United Brands sold 17% in an IPO. A year later, the British food company J. Lyons and Co. purchased Baskin-Robbins from United Brands and all public stock. J. Lyons then merged with Allied Breweries, becoming Allied-Lyons in 1978. Allied-Lyons then merged with Pedro Domecq S.A. in 1994, becoming Allied Domecq. Baskin-Robbins and Dunkin' Donuts comprise Dunkin' Brands, Inc. Dunkin' Brands was part of Allied Domecq until its purchase in 2006 by a group of private equity firms - Bain Capital, Thomas H. Lee Partners, and The Carlyle Group.

In 2006, the company's "BR" logo was updated such that it doubles as the number "31" to represent the 31 flavors, with the "31" formed by the parts of the letters "BR" which are rendered in pink, in contrast to the rest of the logo which is rendered in blue.

In 2008, Baskin-Robbins launched a full menu of frozen desserts called "BRight Choices". These included frozen yogurt, reduced-fat ice cream, no sugar added ice cream, and dairy-free ice cream flavors.

Irv Robbins died at Eisenhower Medical Center in Rancho Mirage, California, on May 5, 2008, at age 90.

In August 2012, Dunkin' Brands became completely independent of the private equity firms.

While Baskin-Robbins struggled in the early years of the 2000s to retain business with competitors such as frozen yogurt shops, 2013 saw a turnaround in the company's fortunes, with four new U.S. stores opened. An additional five to ten shops were planned to open in 2014. However, Baskin-Robbins ultimately surpassed that goal with a grand total of 17 net new openings throughout 2014, and continued growth of the brand with 15 new stores opened in 2015. Many new Baskin-Robbins shops are co-branded with Dunkin' Donuts, including California's first co-branded location of the two in San Diego, which opened in March 2014.

In 2014, Baskin-Robbins also began selling its ice cream for the first time in supermarkets across the U.S.

In July 2017, Baskin-Robbins started adding their locations to delivery service platform DoorDash to deliver ice cream in 22 cities across United States. In the same month they gave free samples of Mint Chocolate Chip Polar Pizza at stores across the country from noon to 5 pm.

Baskin-Robbins began testing a new store format featuring state-of-the-art display cases, original artwork and new product offerings in late 2018. The "Moments" concept was first showcased in Fresno, California, followed by El Paso, Texas.

As a publicity stunt for the third season of Stranger Things, Baskin-Robbins allowed its most popular location in Burbank, California, to be transformed into a Scoops Ahoy for two weeks. Actors and Baskin-Robbins staff members wore Scoops Ahoy uniforms and pretended to work for Scoops Ahoy. The stunt was so popular people had to stand in line for four hours. Clues for an alternate reality game included the participation of all 2,500 locations.

In December 2020, Dunkin' Brands was purchased by Inspire Brands.

Baskin-Robbins debuted an updated logo, alongside the new tagline "Seize the Yay", on April 11, 2022.

International

Baskin-Robbins has more than 8,000 shop locations in: Aruba, Australia, Bahrain, Bangladesh, Bhutan, Canada, China, Colombia, Curaçao, Dominican Republic, Ecuador, Estonia, Egypt, Honduras, India, Indonesia, Ireland, Japan, Kazakhstan, Kuwait, Latvia, Malaysia, Morocco, Nepal, Oman, Pakistan, Qatar, Saudi Arabia, Singapore, South Korea, Spain, Sri Lanka, Taiwan, Thailand, Tajikistan, United Arab Emirates, United Kingdom, United States, Uzbekistan, Vietnam and Yemen. International locations feature flavors of ice cream popular to the tastes of each country, such as Red Bean, Litchi Gold, Blackcurrant and Cantaloupe. 
The most popular flavor of Baskin Robbins in Asia are Mint Chocolate Chip and Cookies & Cream. 

Baskin-Robbins has previously been present in other countries such as Armenia, Azerbaijan, Belarus, Malta, Maldives, Mauritius, Mexico, Netherlands, Panama, Philippines, Portugal, Russia, South Africa and St. Maarten. 

Cambodia does not have any locations of Baskin-Robbins but their products are officially available at a Au Bon Pain bakery franchise.

In Japan, Taiwan and mainland China, Baskin-Robbins is known popularly as "31" or "31 ice cream".

Australia
Baskin-Robbins Australia is a wholly owned and operated subsidiary of Inspire Brands, the parent company of Baskin-Robbins and Dunkin'. In October 2010, Dunkin' Brands terminated its license agreement with Allied Brands Group for Baskin-Robbins in Australia, and now supports its Australian franchisees directly. The Baskin-Robbins Australia Franchise Support & Training Centre is based in Brisbane.

Controversies 
In 2019, an ad advertising a new ice cream flavor in South Korea, "Pink Star", featuring child model Ella Gross, sparked a controversy, with some describing the ad as "overly sexualized". The company withdrew the ad and apologized to its customers.

See also 
 List of ice cream parlor chains
 Häagen-Dazs
 Ben & Jerry's

References

External links

 
  Baskin Robbins Australia
  Baskin Robbins Japan (The corporate name is “B-R 31 ICE CREAM CO., LTD.“ in Japan.)
 Baskin Robbins Middle East

Inspire Brands
Ice cream brands
Ice cream parlors
Fast-food franchises
Fast-food chains of Singapore
Fast-food chains of the United States
Restaurants established in 1945
1945 establishments in California
Companies based in Glendale, California
Restaurant chains in the United States
Restaurant chains in Singapore
Specialty food shops in Singapore
Companies based in Norfolk County, Massachusetts
Canton, Massachusetts
2020 mergers and acquisitions